World Patent Marketing (WPM), founded in 2014 by George G. Cooper was a fraudulent Miami-based corporation that presented itself as an invention-promotion firm but was later determined by the Federal Trade Commission (FTC) to defraud investors seeking to market inventions. In March 2018, following an FTC investigation, World Patent Marketing was shut down and Cooper was banned from the patent industry and ordered to pay nearly $1 million in FTC fines.

WPM was described as part of a "long history of invention scammers", although "few exceeded George G. Cooper at wringing so much money out of individual victims. The company defrauded thousands of consumers out of millions of dollars by promising inventors lucrative patent agreements. WPM marketed false success stories, collected sizable fees from clients, did not deliver on their promises, and later used threats and intimidation to discourage complaints.The company also recruited a group of notable individuals to serve on their advisory board, and boasted about them in press releases and other promotional material.

Business model
World Patent Marketing presented itself as a legitimate company, legally registered as a "vertically integrated manufacturer and engineer of patented products." In practice, their business model was to lure would-be inventors through television or internet advertisements. WPM billed itself as a champion of military veterans, offered military discounts, and targeted veterans in its marketing. Visitors to the World Patent Marketing website would find a listing of WPM's Advisory Board and a series of misrepresentations including success stories, testimonials, and major retailers in which customers' products were sold. WPM promised would-be inventors a wide range of support in patenting their ideas, in return for upfront fees ranging from $8,000 to >$65,000. Once customers had paid, however, WPM would typically ignore them, fail to provide the promised services, and threaten them with legal action if they attempted to get their money back.

Following a criminal investigation, in May 2017 the Federal Trade Commission (FTC) issued a preliminary report in which they outlined the company's method of operation.  According to the FTC, when potential customers submitted their proposed product ideas they were first told that  World Patent Marketing's "review team" was researching the proposal because "the company is so selective with the ideas they choose to work with." They told potential customers that their review included a "Global Invention Royalty Analysis" containing a marketability study created by a "Harvard University & MIT Research Team." Shortly thereafter the company contacted the customer with a sales script saying:

We had our final meeting with the Review Team regarding your idea. And basically from all the research that's been done on [your idea], the research tells us there's definitely potential to patent your idea. Because of that, I have the green light from the company to let you know that WPM wants to be a part of your new product idea and help you to protect it and bring it to the commercial marketplace. So, first of all congratulations! . . . The company loved your idea! They think it has a lot of potential. Especially the Sr. Product Director, who is in charge of which ideas are considered for the upcoming trade show. He sees some good opportunities ahead.
However, the FTC concluded that the company had no Review Team and no association with Harvard or MIT, nor had it appeared to ever turn down an idea for a new product.

Several of the more unusual inventions and partnerships that World Patent Marketing listed in their press releases included a "Masculine Toilet" for unusually well-endowed males, a partnership  arrangement with physicist Ronald Mallett to develop a time-travel machine, and a website claiming proof of the existence of Bigfoot.

Suppression of complaints

According to the FTC, World Patent Marketing used threats  of criminal prosecution and intimidation to discourage and suppress complaints.  A review of emails done by Forbes featured an example of  a woman who had filed a complaint with the Better Business Bureau after she had been unsuccessful in her attempts to negotiate a refund.  She then received  an email from a company lawyer telling her that seeking a refund constituted extortion and "since you used email to make your threats, you would be subject to a federal extortion charge, which carries a term of imprisonment of up to two years and potential criminal fines. See 18 U.S.C. § 875(d)."

The FTC reported that World Patent Marketing also attempted to frighten their customers by sending them emails describing a company security team of "all ex-Israeli Special Ops and trained in Krav Maga, one of the most deadly of the martial arts...The World Patent Marketing Security Team are the kind of guys who are trained to knockout first and ask questions later."

In their 2017 report the FTC included an example of emails that the company used to prevent or retract complaints:

Hey Genius [ ] I understand you emailed one of my board members telling her you think my company lacks integrity and you think we might be a fraud. Just wanted to let you know that is probably going to be the most expensive email you ever sent. I hope it was worth it . . . meet my attorneys Eric Creizman and Andrew Levi [ ] they really enjoy meeting new people.

In early 2015, when posts critical of WPMI appeared on Ripoff Report, a consumer complaint company's website, advisory-board member Matthew Whitaker phoned the operator of the website and, using vulgar language, threatened to sue the owner and ruin his business for allowing "false" reports, even threatening the owner with Department of Homeland Security intervention.

Advisory board

According to the FTC and journalists who have read the email exchanges between the company and its customers, the company relied heavily on the influence of its advisory board members to both attract customers and threaten them. In an April 2016 email George G. Cooper replied to an angry customer, "Do you think all these powerful and influential people would join forces with me if what you said were true? We have former US Attorneys, members of President Obama's advisory council, military generals, famous doctors. Think about it." Promotion scripts used by company representatives also instructed them to boast about the company's "incredible advisory board" and mention Matthew Whitaker by name. Whitaker was also used in broader marketing; on November 2014, George Cooper, the CEO, wrote an email to a brand building company with the subject line, "Let's build a Wikipedia page and use Whitaker to make it credible."

Israeli general Nitzan Nuriel joined the advisory board in 2015, and later welcomed the addition of Ambassador Dell L. Dailey to the board, saying, "Safety and security are the most challenging issues of our day. Winning the war against terror requires integrity and advanced technology. At World Patent Marketing we are committed to making the world safer, more secure and more prosperous".

In 2017, former advisory board member Brian Mast made a statement to court that he was appointed to the advisory board without his consent. Another board member, Aileen M. Marty, a professor of infectious disease at Florida International University in Miami, said she had been told that she would be sent patent ideas to review. She never received any and returned the check she had received when she heard the company might be committing fraud. She commented, "I wish I had never heard of the company and I wish that my name were not in any way associated with it. I can't turn back time and not accept the offer to be on their board — believe me if I could, I would."  Following the shut down, while other advisory board members returned fees they had received, according to news reports Whitaker did not respond to a request for fees to be returned.

Shut down

In April 2016 when an irate customer, Crystal Carlson, received a threatening email from Cooper she searched Facebook and found dozens of other inventors who had also been scammed.  Most notably she tracked down the inventor of "Teddy's Ballie Bumpers," which World Patent Marketers were using as a star success story, saying that the inventor had seen sales "skyrocket".  However, the inventor told Carlson that the Patent Office had rejected his application and he was left with thousands of bumpers stored in a warehouse, selling only 15.  Carlson organized victims and they filed a class-action lawsuit in December 2016 alleging deception, fraud, and violations of the American Inventors Protection Act's disclosure rules.  Cooper's firm claimed to not be bound by the American Inventors Protection Act and accused the claimants of blaming the company for the failure of their invention ideas.  

In January 2017, an undercover FTC investigator contacted the firm with his idea for an invention, a recipe. As usual, a salesperson responded he "had a great idea with lasting power" and "should expect a revenue stream for decades" even though recipes are almost impossible to patent.

The company was shut down by the FTC in March 2017.  According to the FTC, "consumers paid George G. Cooper and his companies, World Patent Marketing Inc. thousands of dollars to patent and market their inventions based on bogus 'success stories' and testimonials promoted by the defendants. But after they strung consumers along for months or even years, the defendants did not deliver what they promised. Instead, many customers ended up in debt or lost their life savings with nothing to show for it."

In 2018 Cooper was banned from running businesses that promote inventions. Inventors invested a total of $26 million with the company, of which the FTC had only located $2 million.

See also
Scams in intellectual property

References

American companies established in 2014
Defunct marketing companies of the United States
Corporate crime
Scandals in the United States
2014 establishments in Florida
2017 disestablishments in Florida
American companies disestablished in 2017
Business services companies established in 2014
Business services companies disestablished in the 21st century